Europa Pegasus F.C. were a football team from Gibraltar. They played in the Gibraltar Second Division and the Rock Cup.

References

External links 
 

Defunct football clubs in Gibraltar